The Maryland Historical Trust serves as the central historic preservation office in Maryland. The properties listed reside in and around modern Laurel, Maryland.

List of properties
Maryland Historical Trust properties in Laurel, Maryland

PG-LAU-01, Laurel Historic District
PG-LAU-01-01, Sales' House, 703 N. Main Street
PG-LAU-01-03, Mary Kraski's Double House, 708-710 N. Main Street
PG-LAU-01-04, Marion St. Clair House, 709 N. Main Street
PG-LAU-01,05, Mary Kraski's Double House #2, 712-714 N. Main Street
PG-LAU-01-06, Andre-Hansen Double House, 809-811 N. Main Street
PG-LAU-01-07, Oldest Mill House (McCeny's Brick Double House), 817-819 N. Main Street
PG-LAU-01-08, Luther & Grace Welsh House (Daya Jain Property), 123 Second Street
PG-LAU-01-09, James A. Clark House (Tastee Foods Property II), 121 Second Street
PG-LAU-01-10, Thomas L. Fairall Property (Nichols and Hurtt Property), 120 Second Street
PG-LAU-01-11, Robert Coward House, 111 Second Street
PG-LAU-01-13, Isabella Whitworth House (Williams Property), 105 Second Street
PG-LAU-01-14, Thomas Young House (Wesmar Enterprises Property), 200 Main Street
PG-LAU-01-12, Fairall Foundry (First Street Foundry), First Street
PG-LAU-01-16, Tastee Diner Property (Tastee Foods Property I), 118 Washington Boulevard
PG-LAU-01-18, Ward Building (Laurel Plumbing Supply Property), 132 Washington Boulevard (US 1)
PG-LAU-01-21, Montgomery Street Historic District, Between Washington Boulevard and Eleventh Street and Main and Montgomery Streets
PG-LAU-01-21, Phelps and Shaffer, 900 Montgomery Street
PG-LAU-02, St. Mark's Methodist Episcopal Church, 601 Eighth Street
PG-LAU-03, Ivy Hill Cemetery, Sandy Spring Road (MD 198)
PG-LAU-04, Avondale Mill (Crabbs Mill), 21 Avondale Street
PG-LAU-05, Laurel High School, 701 Montgomery Street
PG-LAU-06, Laurel Railroad Station (Baltimore & Ohio Railroad Station, Laurel)
PG-LAU-07, Eisenhower House (Mrs. Ray's Boarding House), 327 Montgomery Street
PG-LAU-08, Gude House (Jardin, Armand House, Winterburne), 13910 Laurel Lakes Avenue
PG-LAU-09, Louisa S.B. Cowden House (CAM Associates Property), 804 Lafayette Avenue
PG-LAU-10, Stewart Manor Neighborhood,
PG-LAU-11, E. Wright Newman House (Melbourne and Feagin Apartments), 320 Second Street
PG-LAU-12, Cronmiller House (Mercurio House), 200 Laurel Ave.
PG-LAU-13, John R. Jones Subdivision, 308-318 Second Street
PG-LAU-14, Channey-Jones Property (Melbourne and Feagin Property), 306 Second Street
PG-LAU-15, Samuel Phillips House, 300 Second Street
PG-LAU-16, The Free Quill Building (Heier Property I), 126 Washington Boulevard (US 1)
PG-LAU-17, Charles F. Shaffer House (Heier Property II), 130 Washington Boulevard (US 1)
PG-LAU-18, Ward Building (Laurel Plumbing Supply Property), 132 Washington Boulevard (US 1)
PG-LAU-19, Fisher Building (Laurel Realty Company, Inc.), 150 Washington Boulevard (US 1)
PG-LAU-23, Richard Hill Property (Sylvester G. Frederick, Jr. Property), 7401 Old Sandy Spring Road
PG-LAU-24, Bridge 16001, Washington Boulevard (US 1) over Patuxent River

References

 
History of Maryland
Maryland-related lists